The sixth generation iPod Touch (marketed as the iPod touch) is a mobile device designed and marketed by Apple Inc. with a touchscreen-based user interface. It is the successor to the iPod Touch (5th generation), becoming the first major update to the iPod lineup in more than two and a half years. It was released on the online Apple Store on July 15, 2015, along with minor upgrades to the iPod Nano and iPod Shuffle. This generation of iPod Touch was officially discontinued by Apple on May 28, 2019, with the release of its next-generation successor. It supports up to iOS 12.5.7, released on January 23, 2023.

Features

Software

The sixth-generation iPod Touch features iOS, Apple's mobile operating system.

The device originally shipped with iOS 8.4, which was released on June 30, 2015, along with the Apple Music streaming service. It can play music, movies, television shows, audiobooks, and podcasts and can sort its media library by songs, artists, albums, videos, playlists, genres, composers, podcasts, audiobooks, and compilations. Scrolling is achieved by swiping a finger across the screen. Alternatively, headset controls can be used to pause, play, skip, and repeat tracks. However, the EarPods that come with the sixth-generation iPod touch do not include a remote or microphone.

The sixth-generation iPod Touch supports iOS 9 through iOS 12. The latest version of iOS that this device can run is 12.5.7, which is a security update to iOS 12 only for devices that cannot run iOS 13.

Hardware
The sixth-generation iPod Touch features the Apple A8 and Apple M8 motion co-processor chipset with 64-bit architecture which is the same chip on iPad Mini 4, Apple TV 4th Gen, iPhone 6, and the HomePod, but it is slightly underclocked at 1.1 GHz (the iPhone 6 series was clocked at 1.4 GHz while the iPad Mini 4 was clocked at 1.5 GHz) because of its small battery. It has 1 GB of LPDDR3 RAM, twice the amount as the previous-generation iPod touch. Apple's Metal graphics technology is also compatible with this generation of iPod touch. With regard to battery life, this device is powered by a non-removable 1,043 mAh lithium-ion polymer battery. Based on tests conducted by Apple, the device can provide up to 40 hours of audio playback or 8 hours of video playback.

The iPod touch features an 8 MP rear iSight camera with video which can record in 1080p at 30 fps, or 120 fps in slow-motion mode that records at 720p. The camera also supports a burst mode and has an LED flash. Unlike the previous-generation version, the rear camera on the sixth-generation iPod Touch lacks a sapphire crystal lens. The front camera is unchanged from the previous generation, a 1.2 MP sensor and can record video up to 720p. It is the first iPod touch that is available with 128 GB of storage, partially filling the void left behind by the iPod Classic which offered 160 GB of storage at the time it was discontinued.

Design
The exterior design of the sixth-generation iPod touch is largely identical to that of its predecessor, with the exception of the iPod Touch Loop button, which was removed.

Accessories
The sixth-generation iPod touch comes with a Lightning Charging cable. This model also comes with the EarPods without Remote and Mic. This iPod touch is compatible with Apple's AirPods wireless headphones, which were announced at the September 7, 2016, Apple Special Event along with the iPhone 7, and released in late December 2016. It is also compatible with the EarPods with Lightning Connector which launched concurrently with the iPhone 7, and the remote functions are active.

Reception
Nate Ralph from CNET praised the device's camera quality and noted the iPod Touch's exceptional performance, but criticized it for its middling battery life and small display, and stated that he considered it "largely redundant" due to smartphones and tablets. Sascha Segan from PCMag has also noted the poor battery life, but stated that the iPod Touch is still the best option for anyone who would prefer a handheld media player that does not require an intimate relationship with a cellular carrier.

See also
List of iPod models
List of iOS devices

References

External links
 – official site

IPod
IOS
Computer-related introductions in 2015
Touchscreen portable media players
Products and services discontinued in 2019
Digital audio players